Daniel Garrett (died 1753) was a British architect  who worked on the Burlington Estate, Culloden Tower, Raby Castle, and Banqueting House.

History
Garrett started as a clerk of works, then in 1735 set up his own practice in the North of England. He worked on Hawksmoor's mausoleum at Castle Howard, Yorks from 1737 to 42, as well as streets on the Burlington Estate, such as Savile Row and on Horton Hall in Northamptonshire until 1753.

He wrote the first book on farm-buildings, Designs and Estimates of Farm-Houses, etc. in 1747.

Style
He is thought to have been influenced by Richard Boyle, 3rd Earl of Burlington, his patron. He also used Rococo plasterwork, and some Gothic details in buildings such as Hylton Castle and Gibside Banqueting House in 1751.

References

External links
Biography on Answers.com
Country houses on Parks & Gardens UK
Country houses on The DiCamillo Companion

18th-century English architects
1753 deaths
Year of birth missing